Down and Out in Beverly Hills is a 1986 American comedy film based on the 1919 French play Boudu sauvé des eaux, which had previously been adapted on film in 1932 by Jean Renoir. Down and Out in Beverly Hills was directed by Paul Mazursky, and starred Nick Nolte, Bette Midler and Richard Dreyfuss. The plot follows a rich but dysfunctional family who save the life of a suicidal homeless man. Musician Little Richard appears as a neighbor, and performs "Great Gosh A'Mighty" during a party scene.

Released by Touchstone Films, a film label of The Walt Disney Studios, Down and Out in Beverly Hills has the distinction of being the first film released by Disney to receive an R-rating by the MPAA. The film was Dreyfuss's first substantial hit after his much publicized drug problems and helped to reignite his career.

Plot
Dave Whiteman and his wife, Barbara, are a nouveau-riche couple in Beverly Hills whose 20-year marriage has become stale and sexless. Dave is the owner of "Dave-Bar", a manufacturing business that makes wire garment hangers.  He is having an affair with Carmen, the live-in maid, while Barbara tries to relieve her constant feelings of anxiety through shopping and experimenting with various New Age therapies.  She admits to having hired Carmen partly to satisfy Dave's lust.  Their teenage son, Max, has a strained relationship with his parents, communicates with them largely through his avant-garde videos, and is having issues around his gender presentation. Dave feels estranged from his 19-year-old daughter Jenny, who he believes is anorexic and making poor life choices. The family dog is also poorly adjusted.

Jerry Baskin, a down-and-out homeless man, attempts to drown himself in the Whitemans' pool, driven to despair by the loss of his own dog. Dave saves him and offers to let him to recuperate at their home for a few days. He is intrigued by Jerry's colorful accounts of his past life and former success and wealth, and offers to help him back onto his feet. As they spend time together, meeting Jerry's friends, Dave finds liberation in observing Jerry's lifestyle and outlook, which contrasts his own materialistic conformism. Meanwhile, Jerry overcomes Barbara's hostility and begins a sexual relationship with her. This reawakens her sex drive, and she and Dave re-consummate their marriage. Jerry soon also has sex with Carmen, who now rejects Dave's advances as exploitative, thanks to the political literature Jerry introduced her to. He also cures the dog of its behavioral problems through his empathetic skills, and he persuades Max to come out to his parents in his androgynous persona. Finally, he seduces Jenny, just as she vehemently denounces him as a manipulative psychopath. When next seen, at an extravagant party thrown by the Whitemans, she has overcome her apparent anorexia and declares herself deeply in love with him. This development impels Dave to physically attack Jerry, and the major characters end up floundering in the swimming pool. The following morning, Jerry ruefully confesses to inventing the stories he had told of his past and prepares to leave the Whitemans' home. Wandering down the back service alley with the family dog (now his firmly bonded companion), Jerry turns to see the entire household gathering in the alley, gazing after him longingly. Without a word, he turns back to rejoin them, and they re-enter the grounds of the house together, apparently to resume their unorthodox living arrangement.

Cast
 Nick Nolte as Jerry Baskin
 Bette Midler as Barbara Whiteman 
 Richard Dreyfuss as Dave Whiteman
 Elizabeth Peña as Carmen the Maid 
 Little Richard as Orvis Goodnight
 Evan Richards as Max Whiteman 
 Tracy Nelson as Jenny Whiteman
 Felton Perry as Al
 Dorothy Tristan as Dorothy

Production credits
 Mino Argento – Paintings
 Toni Grant as herself, talk radio host

Reception

Box office
The film was a financial success. It opened on 806 screens and was number one at the US box office with an opening weekend gross of $5,726,495. It added 10 more theatres and grossed 7% more in its second weekend, remaining at number one. It grossed $62,000,000 in the US alone on a budget of $14,000,000.

Critical response
On Rotten Tomatoes, the film has an approval rating of 79% based on 29 reviews, with an average rating of 6.9/10. The site's critics consensus reads: "An enjoyable farce that relocates Jean Renoir's Boudu Saved From Drowning to '80s California, offering fine comedic performances from Nick Nolte, Richard Dreyfuss and Bette Midler." On Metacritic, the film has a weighted average score of 82 out of 100 based on eight critics, indicating "universal acclaim". Audiences polled by CinemaScore gave the film an average grade of "B" on an A+ to F scale.

Janet Maslin of The New York Times quipped, "No film of Mr. Mazursky's is without its occasional sentimental excess, and this one even has its silly side; certainly Mr. Mazursky, who wrote the film with Leon Capetanos, knows better than to throw everyone into the pool at the end of a party scene. But as a comedy of manners it has a dependably keen aim, with its most wicked barbs leavened by Mr. Mazursky's obvious fondness for his characters." The final two sentences Roger Ebert's 4-star review of the film read, "Mazursky has a way of making comedies that are more intelligent and relevant than most of the serious films around; his last credit, for example, was the challenging Moscow on the Hudson. So let me just say that Down and Out in Beverly Hills made me laugh longer and louder than any film I've seen in a long time." Shelia Benson's review in Los Angeles Times called it "depth-charge comedy"; however, she had reservations on the outcome of Nick Nolte's character.

Television series

In April 1987, a series based on the film aired on the newly formed Fox Broadcasting Company. Evan Richards (Max) was the only actor to star in both the film and show. It aired five episodes before cancellation, being one of two shows (the other being Karen's Song) that were canceled by the start of the 1987–88 television season by Fox.

Soundtrack

 "Great Gosh A'Mighty!" – Little Richard 
 "California Girls" – David Lee Roth
 "El Tecaliteco" – Mariachi Vargas de Tecalitlan
 "I Love L.A." – Randy Newman 
 "Tutti Frutti" – Little Richard 
 "Down and Out in Beverly Hills Theme" – Andy Summers 
 "Search for Kerouac" – Andy Summers 
 "Nouvelle Cuisine" – Andy Summers 
 "Wave Hands Like Clouds" – Andy Summers 
 "The Mission Blues" – Andy Summers 
 "Jerry's Suicide Attempt" – Andy Summers

While the soundtrack omits the song, the opening and closing credits feature a remix of "Once in a Lifetime" from the 1984 Talking Heads concert film Stop Making Sense.

See also
 List of American films of 1986

References

External links
 
 
 

1986 films
1986 comedy films
American comedy films
American remakes of French films
American films based on plays
Films based on adaptations
Adultery in films
Films about homelessness
Films adapted into television shows
Films directed by Paul Mazursky
Films set in Beverly Hills, California
Films set in Los Angeles
Touchstone Pictures films
1980s English-language films
1980s American films